Kristy Thirsk is a platinum-selling Canadian singer-songwriter best known for her work with Delerium.

Rose Chronicles

She was the singer and a co-writer for the band Rose Chronicles, which was signed to Nettwerk in the 1990s.  Rose Chronicles released two full-length albums: Shiver (1994), which won a Juno Award for Best Alternative Album, and Happily Ever After (1996). The band split up in 1997.

Collaborations
In the years that followed, Thirsk was featured as a guest vocalist and co-writer on albums by Delerium and Balligomingo.  She sang the vocals in Front Line Assembly's cover of Madonna's "Justify My Love" and Mystery Machine's cover of Blondie's "Heart of Glass."

According to Thirsk, in an Auralgasms interview, Garrett Schwarz allegedly borrowed samples from her Delerium song, "Incantation" and then released his own song on the Balligomingo album, Beneath The Surface.  This, she explained, was the reason she discontinued any further collaboration with Schwarz.

Thirsk was also involved in the initial stages of Adrian White's side project Silent Alarm. The Sleepthief album The Dawnseeker, released June 2006, features Thirsk's vocals in the songs "Sublunar (Sweet Angel)".  Sleepthief's follow-up The Chauffeur – The Remix – EP features Thirsk on "Send Me an Angel", a remake of the Scorpions' 1990 power ballad.  She also sings on "Overkill" for the D:Fuse & Mike Hiratzka album Skyline Lounge (July 2007).

Thirsk and fellow Delerium singer Shelley Harland were the two lead vocalists for Delerium's first US tour in 2003. She toured again as the singer with Delerium's European Tour in May 2008, playing in London, Antwerp, Budapest, Prague, Munich, Frankfurt, Berlin, Athens, Thessaloniki, and Moscow.

Solo career
Thirsk's first released solo track was "Bounds of Love", which was on the soundtrack of the movie Kissed in 1997. This song received a Genie Award nomination for Best Movie Theme.

She worked on her own material throughout this period and released her first full-length solo album, Souvenir, in 2003. Souvenir was produced by Eric Rosse (Tori Amos, Lisa Marie Presley).

In May 2008, Thirsk released a limited edition 4-song EP called Under Cover EP with the songs "Hourglass", "Conspiracy", "What If I", and a cover of Prince's "When Doves Cry" that features exclusive mixes of the four songs that will also be on her upcoming solo album. The EP was sold on the tour only and online.

Her song "Out There" was released on the Sirènes compilation album in May 2008.  Kristy designated the song as the theme song for Red Cross Canada in January 2005, in response to the 2004 Great Sumatra-Andaman earthquake/Asian tsunami in the Indian Ocean. Kristy also co-wrote and sang vocals "Black Flowers" from Matt Darey's Urban Astronauts project. This song was a single and club hit in the UK.

Discography

Rose Chronicles

Kristy Thirsk

Guest appearances

References

External links
Official website

Kristy performs Run Away and Truth Fantasy (QuickTime link) at a September 30, 2004 charity concert/fashion/performance art show.
Kristy performs I Know You Are Out There (QuickTime link) as the singer of "Silent Alarm" at a 2005 live acoustic charity performance.

Canadian women rock singers
Canadian singer-songwriters
Year of birth missing (living people)
Living people
Musicians from British Columbia
Canadian women pop singers
20th-century Canadian women singers
21st-century Canadian women singers